Tone Kopelani (born 22 April 1978) is a former New Zealand rugby union player. In 1997 Kopelani played rugby league in the U19 Super League (Australia) competition for the Penrith Panthers. He was selected for the Junior Kiwis before returning to New Zealand and converting to rugby union. Kopelani made his debut for Canterbury as a flanker in the National Provincial Championship in 1999. He changed his position to hooker in 2001 and went on to play for Canterbury and Wellington in the Air New Zealand Cup and for the Crusaders and Hurricanes in the Super 14 Rugby competition. He was also selected for the Junior All Blacks in 2007. In 2008 Kopelani signed with French club CS Bourgoin Jallieu in the Top 14 competition for three seasons. In 2011 Kopelani joined FC Grenoble in the Pro D2 competition where they won promotion to the Top 14. In 2012 Kopelani returned to New Zealand and signed with Northland in the ITM Cup.

In 2014 Kopelani graduated as a police constable from the Royal New Zealand Police College.

External links
Crusaders Profile
Hurricanes Profile
ESPN Scrum Profile

References

1978 births
New Zealand rugby union players
Living people
Junior Kiwis players
New Zealand rugby league players
New Zealand police officers
Rugby union hookers
Rugby union players from Auckland
People educated at Royal New Zealand Police College